Laszki  is a village in the administrative district of Gmina Zabłudów, within Białystok County, Podlaskie Voivodeship, in north-eastern Poland.

The village has a population of 50.

References

Laszki